Routh Goshen, born Arthur James Caley  (1824 – February 12, 1889) was most commonly known as Colonel Routh Goshen or the Arabian Giant or the Palestine Giant. His true origins were kept secret from the public during his performance years in the United States and were obscured by the many apocryphal biographies that were created to publicize him. His actual origins came out slowly after his death. His birth name was Arthur James Caley and he was born on the Isle of Man in 1824. His fictional biographies said he was born in Jerusalem on May 5, 1837. After his retirement in the 1880s, he settled in Middlebush, New Jersey and gained the nickname the Middlebush Giant.

Life as Arthur Caley
Routh Goshen was born Arthur James Caley in 1824 near Sulby, Isle of Man, to Arthur Caley and Anne Kewley. He was baptized on November 16, 1824, in Lezayre parish. He was one of twelve children the couple had. His sister Margaret Caley, moved to New York. In his teens, he began to grow very tall and continued to grow into his 20s. In May 1851, Caley visited friends at Liverpool and news articles were published about his size. At that time, Caley was described as being . Shortly afterwards, Caley exhibited himself in Manchester, then in London and eventually in Paris, France. In February 1853, Caley's mother received a letter saying her son had died on February 1 in Paris, shortly after a life insurance policy had been taken out for him by his manager Etienne Lefevre. It is not known what happened for the next several years of Caley's life. He eventually moved to the United States and adopted the name Colonel Routh Goshen.

Life as Colonel Routh Goshen
By at least 1859, Colonel Routh Goshen had already become known as the "Arabian Giant." By November 1863 he was being billed alongside Anna Swan, General Tom Thumb, and Commodore Nutt at Barnum's American Museum. He was described as being twenty-seven years old at the time and having been born in Jerusalem. He was reported to have settled for a time around 1869 on a farm in Algonquin, Illinois. In 1870 a semi-fictitious biography of his life was published entitled "The History of Palestine and the Present Condition of Old Jerusalem and the Life of Col. Routh Goshan". Another fictional biography described his history as:
This worthy descendant of the Brohdignagian race first saw the light of day forty three years ago in the city of Jerusalem, Palestine. He is of Hebrew and Turkish descent. At present he stands seven feet eleven inches in his stocking feet, weighs 635 pounds, measures ninety one inches around the chest and ninety five inches round the waist. His arms are the thickness of saplings and his fist possesses the ponderosity of the hammer of Thor. The Colonel served in several eventful campaigns. He was in the Turkish army at Jerusalem, and fought through the Crimean war, the war of Italian independence and the campaign of Maximillian in Mexico. ...

In 1876, he toured the United States with Commodore Nutt as part of the Lilliputian Comic Opera's performance of a version of the story of Jack the Giant Killer. In 1878, he toured the United States with P. T. Barnum's New and Greatest Show on Earth. He toured with Barnum's Circus again in 1879, 1880, and 1883. In Summer 1882, he performed at Atlantic City, New Jersey. In June 1884, Goshen helped advertise clothing for a clothing house in Chicago, known for having a gigantic selection. In the following years, he exhibited himself at several dime museums. In July 1888, a fire occurred at Goshen's farm near Middlebush that destroyed several buildings and his collection of memorabilia.

Personal life
He was married at least three times and divorced twice at the time of his death. In March 1859 in Massachusetts he married Clestina N. Townes of Montreal. Around 1869 he married Augusta White a German snake charmer that he met while traveling for his show. They settled near Clyde, New Jersey. At one point fellow circus performer, John Sweet and his wife the bareback rider Mrs. Elizabeth Sebastian lived with the Goshen family. Mrs. Sebastian left John Sweet, and while Goshen was away on tour, Augusta left Goshen. John Sweet and Augusta took $600 worth of silver, $70,000 worth of bonds, a goat, a horse and a wagon from Goshen's farm and eloped. Goshen filed for divorce around January 1879. He then married Mary Louise Welch on April 18, 1880 in Manhattan, NY. She was from Elgin, Illinois. She had met Goshen years earlier through her cousin, a fat lady who once toured with Goshen. After their marriage, they settled down in Middlebush, NJ. In August 1882, while working at Atlantic City, Goshen encountered John Sweet again. Goshen threatened to kill Sweet with a pistol he brandished, and then beat Sweet with a cane. At the time of the assault Sweet owned a farm in New Brunswick, New Jersey that Goshen had lost due to a mortgage, which Sweet had paid off. A warrant was issued for Goshen's arrest and he was ordered to appear before a court in September.

In early 1884, Goshen applied for divorce from Welch, claiming that she was unfaithful. She claimed that he had been unfaithful with three different women. During the divorce, it came out that he was really not an Arabian, but from Lancaster, England. He was also claiming to be sixty-five years old at that time. They were divorced in 1884.

Routh also had two adopted daughters. Lillie, who married Martin Robert, a clog dancer, and Frances Goshen Sylvester (1868-1949). She may have traveled with him in Europe and she was said to have danced for Queen Victoria.

Death and burial
He died at his farm on Amwell Road in Middlebush, New Jersey on February 12, 1889. He had been living in Franklin Township for about 15 years. By the time of his death, he had accumulated a valuable estate. In his will he left everything to his adopted daughter Francis then the wife of Henry Sylvester. If she were to die without any heirs, Goshen wanted his estate to go to his sister, Margaret Caley Gelling of Rochester, New York. His will was contested by his ex-wife Mary Welch who was living with family in Elgin, Illinois.

His funeral was described in the following manner:
The farm house of the dead giant was thronged with villagers long before the hour fixed for the funeral. The remains had been placed in a coffin eight feet long and three feet wide. It was covered with cloth and had been specially made for the deceased. Undertaker Van Duyn said he could not find a hearse large enough to hold the giant's coffin. The pall bearers had a hard struggle in carrying the remains down the incline leading from the house to the road and when they deposited the coffin in the wagon, beads of perspiration stood out on their foreheads. A large crowd followed the remains to the Middlebush cemetery, where the interment took place.
He was originally buried without a tombstone for fear his body would be dug up and put on display. The cemetery is the Cedar Grove Cemetery in Middlebush, New Jersey. His tombstone reads "Col. Routh Goshen, Middlebush Giant, 1837-1889".

Discovery of Goshen's Manx origins

The connection between Arthur Caley and his alias Colonel Goshen was not well known by the public for years after Caley's death in 1889. In the last months of his life, it was reported that Goshen told that his real name was the similar-sounding Arthur Crowley, that he had been born on the Isle of Man about seventy years before, and that the stories previously told about his life were lies. An article about Caley and Goshen entitled "The Mystery of Arthur Caley, the Manx Giant" was published in 1962 in the Journal of Manx Museum. In 1965 The New York Times ran an article about the life of Arthur Caley.

Then in 1980, a letter was sent to the Middlebush Reformed Church stating that his real name was "Arthur James Caley", and claiming he was born in the village of Sulby on the Isle of Man in 1827. This would have him 62 years old when he died.  In 2011 the book The Manx Giant: The Amazing Story of Arthur Caley was published that further documented Caley's life before and after becoming Colonel Goshen.

Aliases
Arthur James Caley
Colonel Routh Goshen
Colonel Routh Goshon
Colonel Ruth Goshon
Colonel Ruth Goshen
Derouth K. Goshon
The Middlebush Giant
The Arabian Giant
The Palestine Giant
The Sulby Giant
The Manx Giant
Arthur Crowley

References

External links

Fort Covington Sun
Circus History: Routh Goshen
Franklin Township Public Library Photo Archive for Middlebush Giant

Biographical History and Adventures of Col. Routh Goshan: the Arabian Giant Semi-fictitious biography from 1870.

1824 births
1889 deaths
British circus performers
People from Franklin Township, Somerset County, New Jersey
People with gigantism
Sideshow performers
Burials in New Jersey
Manx emigrants to the United States
19th-century Manx people